Tim Louis may refer to:

Tim Louis (British Columbia politician) (born 1958), city councillor in Vancouver, British Columbia
Tim Louis (Ontario politician), member of the Canadian House of Commons from Kitchener, Ontario